Tulipa regelii, the plicate tulip or Regel's tulip, is a species of tulip native to southeast Kazakhstan. Rare, growing only in certain dry, rocky areas in the Chu-Ili Range, a northern subrange of the Tian Shan range, it is a very distinctive species with bizarre plicate leaves, usually only one, occasionally two. The species was first formally named by Russian botanist and geographer . It flowers in April.

References

regelii
Endemic flora of Kazakhstan